Pritchardia lanigera, the lo'ulu,  is a species of flowering plant in the family Arecaceae that is endemic to the  island of Hawaii.
It is threatened by habitat loss.

References

lanigera
Trees of Hawaii
Endemic flora of Hawaii
Endangered plants
Taxa named by Odoardo Beccari
Taxonomy articles created by Polbot